The Arkhangelsk Oblast Assembly of Deputies is the regional parliament of Arkhangelsk Oblast, a federal subject of Russia. A total of 47 deputies are elected for five-year terms.

Elections

2013

2018

References 

Politics of Arkhangelsk Oblast
Arkhangelsk Oblast